Vysoký Újezd is a municipality and village in Beroun District in the Central Bohemian Region of the Czech Republic. It has about 1,500 inhabitants.

Administrative parts
Villages of Kozolupy and Kuchař are administrative parts of Vysoký Újezd.

References

Villages in the Beroun District